Happy Lesson is a comedy manga, written by Mutsumi Sasaki and illustrated by Shinnosuke Mori, serialized in Dengeki G's Magazine from April 1999 to September 2002, featuring a high school student who is adopted by five of his teachers.  It was adapted into a five-part OVA series in 2001; a thirteen-episode animated TV series in 2002; a sequel TV series, called Happy Lesson Advance, in 2003; and a second OVA series, Happy Lesson: The Final, in 2004. The series has also been adapted into a series of drama CDs and a Dreamcast game.

The first volume of the manga was licensed and released by A.D. Vision's ADV Manga label in the United States; the first three episodes of the OVA and the first TV series were licensed by the ADV Films label for Region 1 distribution.

Plot
The plot of Happy Lesson is based on five teachers who end up living with a troubled and indifferent orphan and their unusual plan to become mother figures in an effort to make him a productive student. To achieve their plan, they employ various methods, such as science experiments, spiritual cleansing, physical training, and hijinks.

Resembles a harem anime.

Characters

Aside from the male lead, the main female characters follow a distinct scheme in their names. Their surnames are listed off in numbers, from 1 to 10. Furthermore, those characters have the archaic names of the months as their given names; for example, Mutsuki means "January", Kisaragi means "February", and so on.

Voiced by: Daisuke Kishio (Japanese), Josh Meyer (English) 
A high school orphan who has moved into his deceased parent's house by himself, but not for long as each of his teachers recognizes his slipping grades and decide to secretly move in with him, becoming his "Mothers".
In the beginning of the series, it is shown that Hitotose is very good at fighting, as seen when he beats up two guys who were making fun of him because he has no parents; later on, in Happy Lesson Advance, we see his ability to fight numerous times during his conflicts with Nagatsuki Kuron. Hitotose's true feelings about the family are also revealed in Happy Lesson Advance. He realized that he was in love with Mutsuki at the final season and they kissed in the final episode. In the anime version he replaces the original male protagonist, Susumu Arisaka.

The male protagonist in the manga version of the story. He was actually the original male protagonist in the story but his circumstances with Chitose are the exactly the same, but unlike the anime version, he actually converted his private home into a boarding house to earn a living, where much to his chagrin it was his teachers who became his tenants, whom later on become his "Mama's" . He differs in personality from Chitose, being more studious, less irritable and generally nicer to those around him.

Voiced by: Ruri Asano (Japanese), Shaneye Ferrell (English)
Chitose's homeroom teacher and a teacher of Japanese Classics, she is the first to move in with him. She is gentle until Chitose slacks off on studying. She is seen cooking or cleaning the house. At the end of the series, she realizes she's actually in love with Chitose, and the two become a couple.

Voiced by: Akiko Kimura (Japanese), Peyton Hayslip (English)
The introverted science teacher who acts like a cultist. She is far interested in science and things that can be explained through science. Though she usually comes across as 'emotionless', Kisaragi is an incredibly warm, loving, sweet and kind-hearted person who is fond of cute things (such as baby animals, pink pajamas and her son), and cares deeply for the people around her. She is actually an alien, which explains her high technological skills.
She once performs a magic show, with Chitose as the assistant, and when asked, she states it will be a "Black magic show."

Voiced by: Kikuko Inoue (Japanese), Lana Lesley (English)
The school nurse and miko (meaning priestess), Yayoi can be calm and spiritual unless she feels Chitose is in danger, when she may put her sword fighting skills to work. She is seen wearing a Japanese priest dress and puts her sword against Chitose's neck in order to attain a positive response. She is also very popular at school, with many of the male students faking injury or sickness so she could "treat" them.

Voiced by: Kimiko Koyama (Japanese), Larissa Wolcott (English)
The creative arts teacher, Uzuki acts like a small girl and is very happy-go-lucky. She gets into many arguments with Satsuki and is often seen wearing angel-like wings due to her obsession with cosplay.

Voiced by: Kahoru Sasajima (Japanese), Lee Eddy (English)
The athletics coach, Satsuki prefers brawn over brains and has a loud personality. A tomboy, she is seen as very aggressive and violent, acting or speaking without thinking things through, but with a very sweet personality underneath. She is often referred to as "The Bear-Woman" for she is prone to wear pajamas with bears on them and acts like an animal.

Voiced by: Nana Mizuki (Japanese), Leigh Anderson Fisher (English)
Chitose's adopted younger sister. Mina currently attends the middle school section of the same campus as Chitose. She lives with her sister Hazuki (whenever she is not touring) in an apartment building not far from Chitose's house. Mina loves Chitose like a real brother, but also harbors a bit of a deep crush for him and helps Chitose whenever she can. She plans to marry Chitose when she is old enough.

Voiced by: Ryōka Shima (Japanese), Shawn Sides (English)
Chitose's class president. Fumitsuki has a deep crush for Chitose, though he is oblivious to it. She has excellent marks and continuously tries to win Chitose's heart. At times she is very aggressive, seen punching people with great force in a comical manner in order to silence students B and C or to get back at Chitose. She finally confessed her feelings to Chitose in the final season.

Voiced by: Mie Sonozaki (Japanese), Allison Keith (English)
Chitose's adopted elder sister. Hazuki is a pop idol in Japan; because of this, she is usually touring different cities across Japan. Her singing is very popular and has won the hearts of people across the country. A major characteristic is her ability to eat, being able to eat extremely large amounts of food in very little time. This is known as 'Okadu' a fictional technique that begins at level ten and gets harder each level down from nine to one. Hazuki is a sub-instructor of this style who has achieved the top level and the title of Obakyu. (Ep. 4) Based on the costume that seems to come with this title, (seen in Chitose's flashback.) this may be a cameo reference to Obake no Q-taro.

Voiced by: Tamaki Nakanishi
A mysterious kid from China who claims to be the rightful child of Mutsuki. She first appears in Happy Lesson Advance. She is versed in Kung Fu, and contends with Chitose at every chance possible. Although she is first introduced wearing a red China dress, she prefers to dress like a boy. In the end of Happy Lesson Advance she admits that she likes Chitose.

Voiced by: Akiko Nakagawa (Japanese), Carla Witt (English)
Kisaragi's childhood friend. She is first introduced as a highly skilled technician bent on taking over the world, with her technical skills being only second to Kisaragi. After meeting Chitose, she immediately develops a crush towards him and has been seeking to 'capture' him using both casual talking and technological force.
Student B and C
Student B Voiced by: Syuya Hashiba (Japanese), Resif Trebor (English)
Student C voiced by: Takuro Nakagumi (Japanese), Jeffery Sands(English)
Two male students at Chitose's school who pop up every now and then. As their name suggest they each have a letter on their forehead. They seem to exist only to make Fumitsuki miserable as they constantly follow her around with a video camera and make sarcastic comments, often breaking the fourth wall. They were the only members of her poetry club until she kicked them out. They regard Fumitsuki as the A member.

Anime adaptations

Happy Lesson OVA
The manga was first adapted into an animated format in 2001, replacing the original male lead, Susumu Arisaka, with Chitose Hitotose. This first adaptation took the form of a five-part OVA, featuring how the main character meets with the teachers, as well as how he is reunited with his childhood friends, Hazuki Yazakura and Minazuki Rokumatsuri, from the orphanage. It was published from June 2001 to May 2003 by Studio KSS; English adaptations of the first three episodes were licensed and distributed in the United States by ADV Films.

List of episodes

Happy Lesson

List of episodes

Happy Lesson Advance

List of episodes

Happy Lesson: The Final

List of episodes

Theme songs
Happy Lesson OVA
Opening theme: "C'" ("C Dash"), by Hikari Okamoto
Ending theme: "Place", by Five Moms
Happy Lesson
Opening theme: , by Sleepin' Johnny Fish
Ending theme: , by Akiko Nakagawa
Happy Lesson Advance
Opening theme: , by Sleepin' Johnny Fish
Ending themes:
 , by Millio (episodes 1–12)
 "Love Goes On", by Mie Sonozaki (episode 13)
Happy Lesson: The Final
Opening theme: , by Sleepin' Johnny Fish
Ending theme: "Paradise", by Grace

Reception
Happy Lesson received positive reviews from English speaking audiences. Stig Hogset from Them Anime Reviews said that "the show itself actually manages to balance its comedy with the drama, neither one really overlapping or distracting the audience from the main content". Don Houston from DVD Talk review stated that it "was a fun, cute, and even interesting way to spend several hours as Chitose and his gang of lovely teachers handled the various situations they got into with a sly grin and a knowing wink". Chris Beveridge from AnimeonDVD commented that "I found myself laughing more at this than I expected (in a good way) and enjoyed it a lot over the couple of days it took us to get through all of it."

On another note, Happy Lesson - The Final wasn't received as well. "It ruins the family aspect that held this group together." said film and television critic Peter Bradshaw. "Mitsuki was Chitose's 'Number One Mom'--the one he viewed as being most like his own mother in his eyes. These two characters getting together at the end of the series throws both characters into a new, not favorable light." said a critic on Rotten Tomatoes. It was added "The fact that all the other mothers begin vying for this same attention just makes it worse." said Autumn Bartsch of Everyone's a Critic.

References

External links

2001 anime OVAs
2002 anime television series debuts
2003 anime television series debuts
2004 anime OVAs
ADV Films
ADV Manga
Comedy anime and manga
Dengeki Comics
Dengeki G's Magazine
Harem anime and manga
Kadokawa Dwango franchises
Seinen manga
Works about adoption